Asphalt Canyon Suite is a studio album by the jazz guitarist Kenny Burrell. It was recorded in 1969 and released on the Verve label.

Track listing 
All compositions by Kenny Burrell except as indicated
 "Asphalt Canyon Suite Part 1: Introduction / Asphalt Canyon Blues" - 9:05    
 "Asphalt Canyon Suite Part 2: Think About It / Better Get Your Thing Together / Alone in the City" - 11:37    
 "Things Ain't What They Used to Be" (Mercer Ellington) - 3:15    
 "Put a Little Love in Your Heart" (Jackie DeShannon, Jimmy Holiday, Randy Myers) - 4:15    
 "Please Send Me Someone to Love" (Percy Mayfield) - 4:30    
 "Going to Jim and Andy's" - 3:00    
 "Sugar Hill" - 4:58

Personnel 
Kenny Burrell - guitar
Roland Hanna - piano
Unidentified Orchestra arranged by Johnny Pate

References 

Kenny Burrell albums
1969 albums
Verve Records albums
Albums produced by Johnny Pate
Albums arranged by Johnny Pate